The She's So Unusual: 30th Anniversary Tour  (also known as the She's So Unusual Tour) is the twelfth concert tour by American recording artist Cyndi Lauper. Launched to mark the anniversary of her debut solo album, the tour visited North America, Asia and Australia.

Background

The tour was announced via Lauper's website on April 8, 2013. Dubbed as a celebration for fans, the shows will pay tribute to the singer's debut album, released October 14, 1983. Along with the tour, it was also reported Lauper's play, Kinky Boots, released 13 Tony nominations. During an interview with VH1's Big Morning Buzz Live, the singer stated she never saw herself doing an "oldies tour" reliving the glory days. However, she felt compelled to thank her fans for supporting her career for 30 years. She went to say the show was "more for them than me". She also revealed she will perform every track from the album, along with her other hits. On June 3, 2013, Raymond J. Lee released a video for various television presenters and actors lip-syncing her hit "Girls Just Wanna Have Fun". The video featured Kelly Ripa, Rosie O’Donnell, Whoopi Goldberg, Katie Couric, Hoda Kotb and Kathie Lee Gifford; along with the casts of Kinky Boots, The Lion King, Cinderella, The Phantom of the Opera, Spider-Man: Turn Off the Dark and Chicago.

Opening acts
Hunter Valentine (North America)

Setlist
The following setlist is obtained from the concert held at Humphrey's Concerts by the Bay. It is not representative of all dates on the tour.
"Money Changes Everything"
"Girls Just Want to Have Fun"
"When You Were Mine"
"Time After Time"
"She Bop"
"All Through the Night"
"Witness"
"I'll Kiss You"
"He's So Unusual"
"Yeah Yeah"
"The Goonies 'R' Good Enough"
Encore
"Change of Heart"
"Shine"
"Sex is in the Heel"
"True Colors"

Tour dates

Box office score data

External links
Lauper's Official Website

References

2013 concert tours
Cyndi Lauper concert tours